Bishnu Kumari Waiba, popularly known as Parijat was a Nepali writer and poet. She is best known for her novel Shiris Ko Phool for which she won the Madan Puraskar, becoming the first woman to receive the award. She published multiple novels and wrote many poems and stories in her lifetime.

Early life and education
Vishnu Kumari Waiba,Parijat was born in 1937(Nepali 1990 BS ) in the hill station of Darjeeling, India, a place known for its tea gardens. Her mother, Amrita Moktan, died when Parijat was very young, and she was raised by her father and her grandparents. Her father, Dr. K.N. Waiba, was a physician.

The birthplace of Parijat, Darjeeling, is a major centre of Nepali language, culture and literature. Darjeeling is inhabited by Nepali people who also speak the same language and have a similar culture as that of Nepalese people. Parijat was intricately connected to Nepal and Nepali literature from her early childhood. She had a keen interest in literature from her childhood.

Parijat completed part of her schooling in Darjeeling and moved and then settled in Kathmandu, Nepal in 1954. She completed her schooling at Padma Kanya School and received her Bachelor of Arts (B.A) degree. She became paralyzed at the age of 26. Her sister looked after her for the majority of her life.

Career

In 1959, Parijat's first poem was published by Dharti. She published three poetry collections: Akansha, Parijat Ka Kavita and Baisalu Bartaman. Her first short story was Maile Najanmayeko Chhoro. She is, however, best known in Nepal as a novelist. Altogether, she wrote ten novels, of which Shirish Ko Phool gained the greatest popularity. In 1965, she was awarded with the Madan Puraskar for the novel. She also received the Sarwashrestha Pandulipi Puraskar, Gandaki Basunahara Puraskar, and Bridabrit. Shirish Ko Phool is one of the most important piece of work in the whole of literature. She was awarded Madan Prize of 2022 B.S. for this novel. The English translation of Shiris ko Phool, The Blue Mimosa has been adapted in the literature curriculum of the University of Maryland.

She began her literary career with "Dharti" while she was studying in Kathmandu. Besides being a writer of novels, stories, poems, articles etc., she also led the "Ralfa Movement" in 1966.4 She was elected as the member of the Tribhuwan University and was a part of Ralfa literature movement. She also played an important role in the establishment of Pragatisheel Lekhak Sangh and worked for Akhil Nepal Mahila Manch, Bandi Sahayata Niyog and Nepal Manav Adhikar Sangathan.

Parijat remained unmarried. She continued to experience physical setbacks. While she was contributing to literature, she also tried to support social causes and initiated attempts like the Prisoners' Assistance Mission. She died in 1993.

Bengali Hungryalist Movement and Parijat
Several Bengali poets and painters of the Hungry generation movement had stayed in Kathmandu for a few months during the 1960s decade and had been able to exchange indomitable spirits of each other. Parijat's Akansha is a testimony to that spirit. The notable Hungryalist poets and painters who visited Parijat quite frequently were Malay Roy Choudhury, Subimal Basak, Anil Karanjai and Samir Roychoudhury. A collection of Nepali and Hungryalist writings was edited by Samir Roychoudhury.

Notable works
Novels
 Shirish Ko Phool (The Blue Mimosa)
 Mahattahin
 Paribhasit Aankhaharu
 Baishko Manche
 Toribari, Bata Ra Sapanaharu
 Antarmukhi
 Usle Rojeko Bato
 Parkhal Bhitra Ra Bahira
 Anido Pahadsangai
 Boni

Short story
 Maile Najanmayeko Choro

Short story collections
 Aadim Desh
 Sadak Ra Pratibha
 Salgiko Balatkrit Aashu
 Badhsala Jadaa Aunda

Poem collections
 Akanksha
 Parijat Ka Kabita
 Baishalu Bartaman

Memoir essays
 Dhupi Salla Ra Laliguransko Fedma
 Auta Chitramaya Shuruwat
 Aadhyayan Ra Sangharsha

See also
Banira Giri
Bhupi Sherchan
Shankar Lamichhane

References

October 2014 "Nepali Novel – Parijat"

External links
 Few Nepali Poems By Parijat

 
 Biography
 Parijat

1937 births
1993 deaths
People from Darjeeling
People from Kathmandu
Nepali-language poets
Nepalese people with disabilities
Nepalese women novelists
Nepalese women short story writers
Nepalese short story writers
Women novelists
Nepalese women poets
Madan Puraskar winners
20th-century women writers
20th-century Nepalese writers
20th-century novelists
20th-century poets
20th-century short story writers
20th-century Nepalese women writers
20th-century pseudonymous writers
Pseudonymous women writers
Tamang people
Writers from West Bengal